Alexandra "Sasha" Sagan (born 1982 in Ithaca, New York) is an American author, television producer, filmmaker, and podcaster.

Biography
Sagan is the daughter of the writer Ann Druyan and astronomer Carl Sagan. She is a graduate of New York University.

She has written for New York Magazine.

She has played the role of Carl Sagan's mother in Cosmos: Possible Worlds.

Sagan was one of the producers of the short film Bastard (2010). She and Kirsten Dunst were the screenplay writers.

Writing
Her book For Small Creatures Such as We was published in 2019.

Personal life
Sagan lives in Boston with her husband, Jonathan Noel, and their daughter and son. They were married in Ithaca, New York in September 2013.

References

External links
 Interview with Sasha Sagan
 Sasha Sagan interview
 Personal Website
 Sasha Sagan on Twitter
 Sasha Sagan interviews Carolyn Porco
 For Small Creatures Such As We Sasha Sagan Talks at Google

Living people
Sagan family
Carl Sagan
People from Ithaca, New York
Writers from Ithaca, New York
New York University alumni
1982 births